All Star Perche is an annual indoor pole vaulting meeting which is typically held in February at the Clermont-Ferrand Sports Hall in Clermont-Ferrand, France. The meeting was founded by world record-breakers Sergey Bubka and Renaud Lavillenie in 2016. Its creation was a response to the cessation of the annual Pole Vault Stars meeting in Donetsk (also organised by Bubka) due to the War in Donbass.

Two national records were also set at the first edition: Konstantinos Filippidis set a Greek record of 5.84 m while Robeilys Peinado set a Venezuelan record of 4.53 m. The 2017 edition was attended by around 4700 spectators and the meet was given European Athletics Indoor Permit Meeting status. The 2018 meeting showed strength in depth in the men's competition, with seven men clearing 5.88 m, which included a world under-20 record for Sweden's Armand Duplantis. Katie Nageotte won the women's competition on countback, with both her and Anzhelika Sidorova setting a meet record of 4.86 m, while Ninon Guillon-Romarin set a French record of 4.76 m. Piotr Lisek of Poland won the 2019 meet with a world leading performance of 5.93 m while Anzhelika Sidorova and Angelica Bengtsson shared the women's title with clearances of 4.81 m (a Swedish record for Bengtsson).

In 2022 Anzhelika Sidorova set a new meet record on the women's side with a 4.87 m jump. In 2023 Armand Duplantis beat the world record and therefore set a new meet record, with a 6.22 m jump.

Meeting records

Winners

References

External links 
 Official website

Athletics competitions in France
Recurring sporting events established in 2016
Annual indoor track and field meetings
Pole vault
Sport in Clermont-Ferrand
2016 establishments in France